Big Night Out is a television series airing on Viceland, hosted by journalist and Vice correspondent Clive Martin, who is traveling the world to discover how partying has become an act of rebellion, subsistence or survival for young people everywhere.

History 
Big Night Out started as a written series of articles in 2012 on vice.com, written by Vice writer and correspondent, Clive Martin. Big Night Out transitioned to a short form video web series on VICE's newly launched music channel Noisey in 2013, and ran for 8 episodes.

Moving back onto vice.com, Big Night Out had success moving onto longer form more investigative films exploring the relationship between nightlife and wider social and societal issues, with Locked Off garnering significant attention for its exploration of the UK's resurgent illegal rave scene.

In 2016 Viceland commissioned a full TV series to coincide with the UK channel launch. The first season premiered on September 29, 2016.

Episodes

Web Series (Noisey)

VICE Web Series

Season 1: VICELAND 
Clive Martin DJs with a refugee in Greece, obeys curfew in war-torn Ukraine and investigates police crackdowns on nightclubs in the UK. Witnessing partying as more than an act of rebellion, it's an act of survival.

References

External links
 https://web.archive.org/web/20170413073521/https://www.viceland.com/en_us/show/big-night-out-tv

2016 American television series debuts
2010s American documentary television series